KNLR is a commercial Christian contemporary music radio station in Bend, Oregon, broadcasting on 97.5 FM.

External links
Official Website

Contemporary Christian radio stations in the United States
NLR
Radio stations established in 1985
1985 establishments in Oregon
NLR